Louise Germain (1874–1939), née Louise Richier was a French painter.

Biography
Although she was born in Gap, Hautes-Alpes, France, Louise Richier lived much of her childhood and adolescence in Algeria, returning to France by the time she was twenty. By 1894 she was studying in Marseille with the animal painter Walter Bildecombe.

She lived in Aix-en-Provence with her husband Eugene Germain and their two children, Émile and Sylvain.

At age 25, about 1899, she met Joseph Ravaisou and she took to painting. Reportedly, she also worked alongside Paul Cézanne, as did Ravaisou. In 1925, she watched over Joseph Ravaisou on his deathbed.

Germain died in her flat in Aix-en-Provence in 1939. She is buried in the Saint-Pierre cemetery in Aix-en-Provence.

References

1874 births
1939 deaths
People from Gap, Hautes-Alpes
French women painters
20th-century French painters
20th-century French women artists
19th-century French women artists